GIMA (Groupement Industriel Métallurgique Automobile) is a French motorcycle manufacturer that built lightweight bikes from 1947 until 1956. It resumed production in 2005 with the production of modern retro reincarnation of the original 1950s bikes, but compliant with modern standards.

Notes

External links
Official page

Motorcycle manufacturers of France
French brands